The loosu ponnu is a stock character in Tamil cinema, a girl who is portrayed as attractive but naïve and unintelligent. It is regarded as the equivalent of the Manic Pixie Dream Girl and dumb blonde stereotypes in the United States. The loosu ponnu trope became increasingly popular in 1990s Tamil cinema when the masculinity of the hero became severely overblown. It has since received criticism for being misogynistic and regressive.

History and terminology 
According to critic Baradwaj Rangan, the loosu ponnu trope emerged in an era where Tamil filmmakers began casting North Indian women, who did not know Tamil, in leading roles; due to their lip syncing not being perfect (their lines would be dubbed over by others), wild gesticulation and their emotional reactions seeming unusual, "all of this ended up making them look like mad people".

Characteristics 
Loosu ponnus are typically depicted as being bubbly, naïve, childish, lacking professional ambition, having easily detachable ties with their families, and showing unquestioning devotion to heroic males once they fall in love with them. They are also depicted as angelic, in need of constant rescuing, and incapable of doing even simple things in life. Very often, their "cuteness" is directly proportional to how insane their actions may seem to viewers.

Examples 
Known loosu ponnu characters in Tamil films are Anjali (Amala) from Agni Natchathiram (1988), Mythili (Jyothika) in Manmadhan (2004), Suji and Hema (Meera Jasmine) in Pudhiya Geethai (2003) and Sandakozhi (2005) respectively, Haritha (Nayanthara) in Kalvanin Kadhali (2006), Hasini (Genelia D'Souza) in Santosh Subramaniam (2008), Anitha (Taapsee Pannu) in Arrambam (2013), Chitra Devipriya (Kajal Aggarwal) in All in All Azhagu Raja (2013), Keerthana (Nazriya) in Raja Rani (2013 film), Yazhini (Hansika Motwani) in Maan Karate (2014), Shakila (Samantha) in 10 Endrathukulla (2015), Sowmya (Aggarwal) in Paayum Puli (2015), Priya (Motwani) in Uyire Uyire (2016), Aarathu Aanandhi (Sai Pallavi) in Maari 2 (2018), Vandhana (Sayyeshaa) in Ghajinikanth (2018), and Padmini (Priyanka Arul Mohan) in Doctor (2021). Keerthy Suresh has played such characters in films like Remo (2016) and Thodari (2016).

Other languages 
Besides Tamil films, loosu ponnu characters were also noted in Telugu films (known as 'pichi pilla') with Shalini (Rakul Preet Singh) in Spyder (2017), Sukumari (Keerthy Suresh) and Suryakantham (Anu Emmanuel) in Agnyaathavaasi (2018),  Samskruthi (Rashmika Mandanna) in Sarileru Neekevvaru (2020), Genelia D' Souza in Orange (2010).

Criticism 
The loosu ponnu trope has received wide criticism for being misogynistic and regressive. Actress Madonna Sebastian has expressed her dislike for it, saying, "I think it is disrespectful and when people endorse it, even heroines, it becomes a dangerous trend." Aishwarya Rajesh has consciously avoided playing such roles, citing her preference for "sensible" roles.

See also 
 Bimbo
 Ingénue

References 

Depictions of women in film
Female stock characters
Pejorative terms for women
Tamil cinema
Telugu cinema